Kadapa Municipal Corporation (KMC) is the civic body that governs the city of Kadapa in the Indian state of Andhra Pradesh. It is one of the oldest Municipalities of the state, constituted in the year 1868 and was upgraded to Corporation in 2004. Its jurisdiction encompasses an area of 164.08 km2 (63.35 sq mi). Established in the year 2004, the Executive power of the KMC is vested in the Municipal Commissioner, appointed by the Government of Andhra Pradesh which is Currently held by Sri G.Surya Sai Praveenchand I.A.S.   Newly constituted general body elected Sri Kothamaddi Suresh Babu (YSRCP) as Mayor, Smt. Syed Mumthaj Begam (YSRCP) as Deputy Mayor and Sri Bandi Nityananda Reddy (YSRCP) as second Deputy Mayor in March 2021.

History
Kadapa is one of the oldest Municipalities in the Indian state of Andhra Pradesh. It is located in the Rayalaseema region, and is the district headquarters of Kadapa district. It was constituted as a III–Grade municipality in the year 1868. It was then upgraded to II–Grade in 1958 and Special Grade in 1980. It covers an area of 6.84 sq.km. It was upgraded as Municipal Corporation on 17 November 2004 vide G.O.Ms.No.481, dated : 17.11.2004 with an area of 91.05 sq.km. subsequently vide G.O.Ms.No.125, dated : 17.03.2005 and G.O.Ms.No.89, MA, dated : 30.05.2006 the area of corporation was increased to 164.08 km2 (63.35 sq mi) by merging surrounding gram panchayat. The population of the city as per 2001 Census of India is (2,87,093) and the approximate population as per 2011 Census of India is 3,44,078.

Jurisdiction

Civic administration 
The Corporation is administered by an elected body headed by the Mayor. The corporation population as per the 2011 census was 3,44,078. The present commissioner of the corporation is G.Surya Sai Praveenchand I.A.S. and the mayor is Kothamaddi Suresh Babu.

Public services 
The Kadapa Municipal Corporation provides drinking water to the public and its per capita water supply per day is 120 LPCD. It has 3 public parks, secondary schools, elementary schools and many other services including colleges, playgrounds etc.

Functions 

Kadapa Municipal Corporation is created for the following functions:

 Planning for the town including its surroundings which are covered under its Department's Urban Planning Authority .
 Approving construction of new buildings and authorising use of land for various purposes.
 Improvement of the town's economic and Social status.
 Arrangements of water supply towards commercial,residential and industrial purposes.
 Planning for fire contingencies through Fire Service Departments.
 Creation of solid waste management,public health system and sanitary services.
 Working for the development of ecological aspect like development of Urban Forestry and making guidelines for environmental protection.
 Working for the development of weaker sections of the society like mentally and physically handicapped,old age and gender biased people.
 Making efforts for improvement of slums and poverty removal in the town.

Revenue sources 

The following are the Income sources for the Corporation from the Central and State Government.

Revenue from taxes 

Following is the Tax related revenue for the corporation.

 Property tax.
 Profession tax.
 Entertainment tax.
 Grants from Central and State Government like Goods and Services Tax.
 Advertisement tax.

Revenue from non-tax sources 

Following is the Non Tax related revenue for the corporation.

 Water usage charges.
 Fees from Documentation services.
 Rent received from municipal property.
 Funds from municipal bonds.

Kadapa Municipal Elections

2021 Ordinary Elections 
After 2014, third Kadapa Municipal Corporation(KMC) elections were held in March 2021.

2014 Ordinary Elections 
Second Kadapa Municipal Corporation(KMC) election were conduced in 2014.

References

Kadapa
Municipal corporations in Andhra Pradesh
2004 establishments in Andhra Pradesh